Aashrayam is a 1983 Indian Malayalam film, directed by K. Ramachandran. The film stars Prem Nazir, Sukumari, Nedumudi Venu and Sankaradi in the lead roles. The film has musical score by M. B. Sreenivasan.

Cast
Prem Nazir
Sukumari
Nedumudi Venu
Sankaradi
Kalaranjini
Baby Anju
Kasim
Seema
Ramachandran

Soundtrack
The music was composed by M. B. Sreenivasan and the lyrics were written by Poovachal Khader.

References

External links
 

1983 films
1980s Malayalam-language films